Kuala Lumpur Guandi Temple (shortened as KL Guandi Temple), or Kuala Lumpur Emperor Guan Temple, also known as the Kuala Lumpur Kuan Ti Temple, is a Malaysia-based Taoist temple located in the Jalan Tun H S Lee, Kuala Lumpur. Founded in 1887 (another way of saying 1888), it is one of the oldest temples in Malaysia.
Not available for sitting in meditation.

History
Kuala Lumpur Guandi Temple was founded in 1887 by Kwang Chao Association of Kuala Lumpur (吉隆坡广肇会馆).

In the early years of its establishment, Kuala Lumpur Guandi Temple was dedicated to handling affairs of the Ethnic Chinese.

See also
Sin Sze Si Ya Temple
Thean Hou Temple

References

Guandi temples
Taoist temples in Malaysia
Historic buildings and structures
Chinese-Malaysian culture in Kuala Lumpur
19th-century Confucian temples
Religious buildings and structures in Kuala Lumpur
Religious buildings and structures completed in 1887
19th-century establishments in Malaysia
19th-century architecture in Malaysia